BPS CS31082-0001, named Cayrel's Star , is an old Population II star located in a distance of 2.1 kpc in the galactic halo. It belongs to the class of ultra-metal-poor stars (metallicity [Fe/H] = -2.9), specifically the very rare subclass of neutron-capture enhanced stars. It was discovered by Tim C. Beers and collaborators with the Curtis Schmidt telescope at the Cerro Tololo Inter-American Observatory in Chile and analyzed by Roger Cayrel and collaborators. They used the Very Large Telescope (VLT) at the European Southern Observatory in Paranal, Chile for high-resolution optical spectroscopy to determine elemental abundances. The thorium-232 to uranium-238 ratio was used to determine the age. It is estimated to be about 12.5 billion years old, making it one of the oldest known.

Compared to other ultra-metal-poor, r-process enriched stars (as CS22892-052, BD +17° 3248, HE 1523-0901) CS31082-001 has higher abundances of the actinides (Th, U), but a surprisingly low Pb abundance.

See also
 HE0107-5240
 HE 1327-2326
 SDSS J102915+172927
 SMSS J031300.36-670839.3

References

Sources
 Beers, T. C., G. W. Preston and S. A. Shectman, A search for stars of very low metal abundance. I., Astron. J., 90, 2089–2102 (1985)
 Beers, T. C., G. W. Preston and S. A. Shectman, A search for stars of very low metal abundance. II.,  Astron. J., 103, 1987–2034 (1992)
 Cayrel, R., et al. Measurement of stellar age from uranium decay, Nature, Volume 409, Issue 6821, pp. 691–692 (2001)
 Schatz, H., al. Thorium and Uranium Chronometres applied to CS 31082-001, Astrophysical Journal, 579 (2002) 628–638

External links
 
 arXiv: Measurement of stellar age from uranium decay, R. §Cayrel et al.
 R-Process Cosmo-Chronometers

Population II stars
Cetus (constellation)